Ikungi District is one of the six districts of the Singida Region of Tanzania. It is one of the 20 new districts that were formed in Tanzania since 2010; it was split off from Singida Rural District. Ikungi District is bordered to the north by Iramba District, Singida Urban District and Singida Rural District, to the east by Manyara Region, to the south by Manyoni District and to the west by Tabora Region. Its administrative seat is the town of Ikungi.

According to the 2012 Tanzania National Census, the population of Ikungi District was 272,959.

Transport
Paved trunk road T3 from Morogoro to the Rwandan border passes through the district.

The Singida branch of the Central Railway of Tanzanian Railways passes through the district. There is a station at Ikungi town.

Administrative subdivisions
As of 2012, Ikungi District was administratively divided into 26 wards.

Wards 2012

Wards 2002

The Singida Rural District was administratively divided into 30 wards:

 Dungunyi
 Kinyeto
 Iambi
 Ihanja
 Ikhanoda
 Ikungi
 Ilongero
 Irisya
 Issuna
 Maghojoa
 Makuro
 Mangonyi
 Matumbo
 Merya
 Mgori
 Mgungira
 Minyughe
 Misughaa
 Msisi
 Mtinko
 Mudida
 Muhintiri
 Mungaa
 Mwaru
 Ngimu
 Ntuntu
 Puma
 Sepuka
 Siuyu
 Ughandi

References

Sources
Singida Rural District Homepage for the 2002 Tanzania National Census

Districts of Singida Region